The International Development Research Centre (IDRC; , CRDI) is a Canadian federal Crown corporation that funds research and innovation within and alongside developing regions as part of Canada's foreign affairs and development efforts.

Activities 
According to its 2030 Strategy, IDRC's work currently focuses on the following five areas, aimed at contributing to the achievement of the United Nations’ Sustainable Development Goals: climate-resilient food systems; global health; education and science; democratic and inclusive governance; and sustainable inclusive economies.

History 
IDRC was established by the Parliament of Canada in 1970 under the International Development Research Centre Act, which directs IDRC "to initiate, encourage, support and conduct research into the problems of the developing regions of the world and into the means for applying and adapting scientific, technical, and other knowledge to the economic and social advancement of those regions."

Governance 
IDRC's head office is located in Ottawa, Ontario, with regional offices located in Montevideo, Uruguay; Nairobi, Kenya; Dakar, Senegal; Amman, Jordan; New Delhi, India.

IDRC is governed by a board of governors, whose chairperson reports to Parliament through the Minister of International Development.

The board includes:

 Dorothy Nyambi (Ancaster, ON) — Chairperson
 Chandra Madramootoo (Montreal, QC) — Vice-chairperson
 Jean Lebel — President
 Akwasi Aidoo (Gastonia, NC, USA) — Governor
 Alex Awiti (Nairobi, Kenya)
 Sophie D’Amours (Quebec, QC) — Governor
 Purnima Mane (San Mateo, CA, USA) — Governor
 Nurjehan Mawani (Vancouver, BC) — Governor
 Bessma Momani (Kitchener, ON) — Governor
 Gilles Rivard (Ottawa, ON) — Governor
 Hilary Rose (Parc Sherwood, AB) — Governor
 Stephen Toope (Cambridge, UK) — Governor

Regional directors:

 Anindya Chatterjee (Asia)
 Federico Burone (Latin America and the Caribbean)
 Barbara Shenstone (Middle East and North Africa)
 Julie Crowley (Central and West Africa)
 Kathryn Toure (Eastern and Southern Africa)

References

External links
 Official website: International Development Research Centre
 Strategy 2030: a more sustainable and inclusive world
 International Development Research Centre Act and General-Bylaw archived as of 2010

International development organizations
Organizations based in Ottawa
Canadian federal Crown corporations
Global Affairs Canada